Furnerius is a large lunar impact crater located in the southeast part of the Moon, in the area close to the southeastern limb of the nearside or visible Moon. Because of its location, the crater appears oval in shape due to foreshortening but is actually nearly circular. Notable nearby craters include Stevinus to the northwest and Fraunhofer to the south-southwest. Farther to the northwest is the crater Snellius and the Vallis Snellius crater valley.

The rim of Furnerius is worn and battered, with multiple impacts along its length and notches along the base. Much of the wall now rises only slightly above the surrounding terrain, with the lowest sections to the north and south. However the northern wall rises to a maximum elevation of 3.5 km.

The interior floor is marked by fourteen notable craters, the most notable being Furnerius B in the northern half which has a central rise. Dark patches on the floor indicate areas resurfaced by lava. In the northeast part of the floor is a rille designated Rima Furnerius. This cleft is about 50 kilometers in length and follows a course to the northwest where it reaches the north rim of the crater.

In Johann H. Schröter's lunar study of 1791, he sketched this crater with a low dome in the southern half. This feature has proven difficult to identify in subsequent lunar photographs and observations.

The Japanese satellite named Hiten crash-landed in the vicinity of this crater in 1993.

Satellite craters 

By convention these features are identified on lunar maps by placing the letter on the side of the crater midpoint that is closest to Furnerius.

References

External links 
 The Lunar Crater Furnerius and the Mystery of Schroters Dome (accessed 9/15/05)

Impact craters on the Moon